The so-called Sabre of Charlemagne (German: Säbel Karls des Großen) is an early sabre of Hungarian (Magyar) type (presumably made in the early 10th century) which has exceptionally been preserved (as opposed to recovered from the archaeological record) as part of the Aachen regalia of the Holy Roman Empire. Along with the rest of the imperial regalia from both Aachen and Nuremberg, it is now kept in the Hofburg Palace, Vienna.

The Sabre of Charlemagne is not to be confused with Joyeuse, another sword claimed to have been Charlemagne's personal weapon and used as regalia, but associated with the coronation of the French monarch rather than the Holy Roman Emperor.

History 
The sabre is of the Eastern European type and most likely dates to the first half of the 10th century. 
According to tradition, Otto III recovered the weapon when he opened Charlemagne's grave in AD 1000. 19th-century antiquarian scholarship was prepared to accept the weapon's Carolingian age,  but the modern estimate, while compatible with its association with Otto III, rules out any direct connection with Charlemagne.

When French troops approached Aachen in 1794 the Imperial regalia located there were taken to the Capuchin abbey at Paderborn, then to Hildesheim in 1798 and finally to Vienna in 1801. The sabre was stored in the Treasury of the Hofburg Palace in Vienna.
On the orders of Adolf Hitler, the imperial relics were brought to Nuremberg in 1938, where they were displayed in the Katharinenkloster. During the Second World War they were stored in the Historischer Kunstbunker to protect them from aerial bombardment. The Imperial regalia were found there by American soldiers in 1945 and returned to the Hofburg in 1946.

See also

References 

 Hermann Fillitz. Die Insignien und Kleinodien des Heiligen Römischen Reiches. Schroll, Wien und München 1954.
 Wilhelm Schwemmer. "Die Reichskleinodien in Nürnberg 1938–1945" in Mitteilungen des Vereins für Geschichte der Stadt Nürnberg, Vol. 65, 1978, pp. 397–413; online
 Sabine Haag (ed.). Meisterwerke der Weltlichen Schatzkammer, Kunsthistorisches Museum, Wien, 2009, .
 Jan Keupp et al.  (eds.). „… die keyserlichen zeychen …“ Die Reichskleinodien – Herrschaftszeichen des Heiligen Römischen Reiches, Regensburg 2009, .
 Ernst Kubin. Die Reichskleinodien. Ihr tausendjähriger Weg. Amalthea, Wien und München 1991, .

External links 
 Säbel Karls des Großen in the image database of the Kunsthistorisches Museum, Vienna.

Imperial Regalia of the Holy Roman Empire
Charlemagne
Sabres
Medieval European swords
Individual weapons